The BBC Short Trips books are a collection of short story anthologies published by BBC Books based on the television series Doctor Who, following a pattern established by Virgin Publishing's Decalog collections. Three volumes were published between March 1998 and March 2000, before the BBC decided to stop publishing the books. The Short Trips name was later adopted for hardback collections published by Big Finish Productions and licensed from the BBC.

The books

Short Trips
The first volume of stories is Short Trips (BBC Books, 1998), edited by Stephen Cole. It contains the following stories:

More Short Trips
The next volume is More Short Trips (BBC Books, 1999), again edited by Stephen Cole. It contains the stories:

Short Trips and Sidesteps

The final Short Trips collection is Short Trips and Sidesteps (BBC Books, 2000), and was joint edited by Jacqueline Rayner and Stephen Cole. It was intended to show a variety of stories of Doctors and companions that had not necessarily existed in the prime continuity of Doctor Who. Several of the stories were written under pseudonyms, including Tara Samms (Stephen Cole), David Agnew and Norman Ashby. Lawrence Miles wrote two pieces for the collection, one under his own name and one under a pseudonym. It contains the following stories:

Following the publication of this book, the BBC announced that they were no longer going to produce volumes of short stories, due to the cost and amount of work involved in producing them.

Audio books
In 1998, the original Short Trips book was also released on a double cassette as an audio book, featuring five stories from the book (Freedom, Model Train Set, Glass, Stop the Pigeon and Old Flames) read by Sophie Aldred and Nicholas Courtney. An additional story (Degrees of Truth by David A. McIntee, featuring the Third Doctor and the Brigadier) is also on the release. Model Train Set was also released on CD as a BBC Audio.

Two further audio book short story collections were released later that year. Earth and Beyond was read by Paul McGann, featuring "Dead Time" from More Short Trips, "The People's Temple" from Short Trips and original story "Bounty." Out of the Darkness was read by Colin Baker and Nicola Bryant, and features "Moon Graffiti" from More Short Trips, "Wish You Were Here" from Short Trips and original story "Vigil". Earth and Beyond was released on double cassette, whilst Out of the Darkness was released on CD.

Those readings were reissued in 2004 as part of the MP3-CD releases Tales from the TARDIS volumes 1 and 2. These were in turn re-released as box sets of standard audio CDs in 2016 and 2017.

References

Novels based on Doctor Who
Audio plays based on Doctor Who
Book series introduced in 1998